John Leonard Rose (March 25, 1882 – March 31, 1969) was an American attorney and politician who served in the California State Assembly. He represented the 34th district, which at the time included portions of Alameda County.

Life and career
John Leonard Rose was born in March 25, 1882 in Newark precinct of Washington Township, Alameda County, California (present-day Newark, California). His parents had immigrated to California from Portugal.

Rose attended the University of California at Berkeley and graduated law school at Boalt Hall in 1907. He had been admitted to the California Bar in April 1906.

During his early career, he had been a deputy district attorney for Alameda County and had been a law partner of Adolphus Frederic St. Sure. He served in the California State Assembly from 1917 to 1921. After returning from the state legislature, Rose was appointed attorney for the California State Board of Pharmacy. He returned to private law practice as an inheritance tax appraiser for Alameda County, from 1927 until his retirement in 1947.

California State Assembly
Rose served in the 42nd session (1917) of the California State Legislature. He was re-elected and served in the 43rd session (1919).

He entered and left office as a Republican, but was a Democrat for some of his first term.

In the 1917 session, Rose authored Assembly Bills 271, 272, 295, 296, 372, 744, 745, 746, 747, 862, 863, 1100, 1101, 1102, and
1343.

Personal life
His wife was named Mabel.

Rose died on March 31, 1969 in a hospital in Oakland, California.

Electoral history
November 7, 1916
November 5, 1918

References

1882 births
1969 deaths
20th-century American lawyers
20th-century American politicians
California Democrats
California Republicans
Lawyers from Oakland, California
Members of the California State Assembly
People from Newark, California
Politicians from Oakland, California
UC Berkeley School of Law alumni
American people of Portuguese descent